The 2022–23 2. Liga was the 30th season of the 2. Liga in Slovakia, since its establishment in 1993.

Teams

Team changes

Notes

Stadiums and locations

Personnel and kits
Note: Flags indicate national team as has been defined under FIFA eligibility rules. Players and Managers may hold more than one non-FIFA nationality.

League table

Season statistics

Top goalscorers

Clean sheets

Discipline

Player

Most yellow cards: 8
4 Players

Most red cards: 2
 4 players

Club

Most yellow cards: 54
Púchov

Most red cards: 4
Púchov

References

External links

2022–23 in Slovak football leagues
2022-23
Slovak
Current association football seasons